Jeong Seong-hoon (born June 27, 1980) is South Korean former professional baseball player. He represented the South Korea national baseball team at the 2006 World Baseball Classic. 

After nine seasons with the LG Twins, Jeong was released by the team at the end of the 2017 season. He played one more season, for his original franchise, the Kia Tigers, in 2018, before retiring.

His 2,159 career hits makes him one of only 11 players to amass more than 2,000 hits in their KBO League careers.

Filmography

Television show

See also 
 List of KBO career hits leaders

References

External links
Career statistics and player information from Korea Baseball Organization

KBO League infielders
LG Twins players
Kiwoom Heroes players
Hyundai Unicorns players
Kia Tigers players
Haitai Tigers players
South Korean baseball players
2006 World Baseball Classic players
1980 births
Living people
Sportspeople from Gwangju